László Attila Hodgyai (born 18 January 1992) is a Romanian professional footballer of Hungarian ethnicity, who plays as a forward.

Honours
Csíkszereda
Liga III: 2018–19

References

External links
 
 

1992 births
Living people
Sportspeople from Miercurea Ciuc
Romanian footballers
Association football forwards
ASA 2013 Târgu Mureș players
Ferencvárosi TC footballers
CFR Cluj players
FK Csíkszereda Miercurea Ciuc players
Liga I players
Romanian expatriate footballers
Romanian expatriate sportspeople in Hungary
Expatriate footballers in Hungary

Romanian people of Hungarian descent
Romanian sportspeople of Hungarian descent